This is a list of books and essays about Clint Eastwood.

 
 

 
 

 
 
 

 
 

 
 

 

 

Eastwood
Clint Eastwood